The year 691 BC was a year of the pre-Julian Roman calendar. In the Roman Empire, it was known as year 63 Ab urbe condita . The denomination 691 BC for this year has been used since the early medieval period, when the Anno Domini calendar era became the prevalent method in Europe for naming years.

Events

By place

Assyrian Empire 
 King Sennacherib of Assyria razes Babylon (or 689 BC).
 Sennacherib defeats Humban-nimena of Elam in the Battle of Halule.

Births

Deaths

References